How Have You Been may refer to:

 "How Have You Been", a song from John B. Sebastian (album), 1970
 "How Have You Been", a song from Ani DiFranco's Out of Range (album), 1994
 "How Have You Been", a song from Angela Chang's 2012 album, Visible Wings
 "How Have You Been", a 2014 song by Eric Chou
 "How Have You Been", a song used as a theme for a Taiwanese television series, All in 700

See also
 How You Been (disambiguation)
 How Are You (disambiguation)
 How Do You Do (disambiguation)